Samfoto Picture Agency is located in Oslo, Norway. The agency represents a large number of Norwegian and Scandinavian freelance photographers. The stock photographs include more than 300 000 images, of which approximately 250 000 are accessible on the Internet (as of Apr. 2010).

History 
Samfoto was founded by a group of photographers in 1976, based on the philosophy of a picture agency run by photographers. Approximately 100 Norwegian photographers joined Samfoto in the eighties and nineties. In 1988 the association Norwegian Nature Photographers began collaborating with the agency. In 1989 the women's photographer association Hera joined Samfoto. In the years 2000 – 2001 distribution of pictures from the archive was changed from physical to digital and the Samfoto archive was launched on the Internet.

External links 
 Samfoto
 Norske Naturfotografer  (Norwegian Nature Photographers)

Companies based in Oslo
Stock photography